The Cavan Junior Football Championship is an annual Gaelic Athletic Association club competition between Intermediate Cavan Gaelic football clubs. It was first competed for in 1925. The winners get to represent their county in the Ulster Club Championship and in turn, go on to the All-Ireland Junior Club Football Championship. The defending champions were Templeport who defeated Cornafean in the 2015 decider.

Format
10 teams will contest the Hotel Kilmore Intermediate Football Championship.

Team Changes
The following teams have changed division since the 2015 championship season.

To J.F.C.
Relegated from I.F.C.

From J.F.C.
Promoted to I.F.C.
 Templeport

2016 Championship

Round 1

References

External links
 Cavan at ClubGAA
 Official Cavan GAA Website

Cavan Junior Football Championship
Cavan GAA Football championships